The year 2018 in Japanese music.

Number ones
Oricon number-one albums
Oricon number-one singles
Hot 100 number-one singles

Awards
60th Japan Record Awards
2018 MTV Video Music Awards Japan

Albums released

January

February

March

April

May

June

July

August

September

October

November

December

Debuting and returning artists

Debuting groups

April
Day6
dps
Dreamcatcher
Empire
EXID
Fantastics from Exile Tribe
First Place
GFriend
Gugudan
Hachimitsu Rocket
King & Prince
Mamamoo
Myteen
Raise A Suilen
Red Velvet
Seventeen
Spira Spica
STU48
Uijin
Yoshimotozaka46
Zutomayo

Debuting soloists

 Aina the End
 Shuta Sueyoshi
 Ryuji Imaichi
 Taiki Yamazaki
 Minori Suzuki
 Mai Fuchigami
 Misako Uno
 Ryucheru
 Rika Tachibana
 Kiyoe Yoshioka
 Kaori Ishihara
 Shigeru Joshima
 Haruka Yamazaki
 Yuma Uchida
 Makoto Furukawa
 Ryusei Yokohama
 Yuka Ozaki
 Reona
 Chiaki Satō
 Yuka Ozaki
 Akari Nanawo
 Chiaki Ito
 Meimi Tamura
 Halca
 Taemin
 Key

Returning from hiatus

 Ayami Mutō
 Eir Aoi
 KAT-TUN
 Ami Wajima
 Ellegarden
 Hilcrhyme
 Ikimonogakari
 Charisma.com

Disbanding and retiring artists

Disbanding

 Idol Renaissance
 La PomPon
 Mix Speaker's,Inc.
 GEM
 Chelsy
 Cheeky Parade
 Chatmonchy
 Ciao Bella Cinquetti
 Tackey & Tsubasa
 Passpo
 Babyraids Japan
 Vanilla Beans
 X21
 Aqua Timez
 Secret
 Tahiti

Retiring

 Tetsuya Komuro
 Namie Amuro
 Chiyo Okumura
 Hideaki Takizawa (Tackey & Tsubasa)
 Hitomi Yoshizawa

Going on hiatus

 Charisma.com
 Folks
 Tsubasa Imai (Tackey & Tsubasa)
 Chris Hart
 Mao Denda
 Jero
 Yumi Hara
 Keito Okamoto (Hey! Say! JUMP)
 Nobuo Uematsu
 Shiori Niiyama
 Rice
 Sads

Deaths
 January 26 – Junji Yayoshi, guitarist and record producer (b. 1968)
 January 31 – Itokin, MC and track maker (b. 1979)
 April 24 – Doji Morita, singer-songwriter (b. 1953)
 April 27 – Yukiji Asaoka, singer and actress (b. 1935)
 May 16 – Hideki Saijo, singer and actor (b. 1955)
 October 12 – Takehisa Kosugi, composer and violinist (b. 1938)
 November 14 – Masahiro Sayama, jazz pianist (b. 1953)
 November 25 – Norio Maeda, jazz pianist, composer, and conductor (b. 1934)

See also
 2018 in Japan
 2018 in Japanese television
 List of Japanese films of 2018

References